is a Japanese mountaineering manga series  written and illustrated by Shinichi Ishizuka. It was serialized by Shogakukan in the seinen manga magazine Big Comic Original from September 2003 to June 2012, with its chapters collected in eighteen tankōbon volumes. It depicts the adventures of a volunteer with an alpine search and rescue team in the Japanese Alps.

Gaku: Minna no Yama received the 2008 Manga Taishō ("Cartoon Grand Prize") and the 2009 Shogakukan Manga Award for general manga. A live-action movie based on Gaku was released on May 7, 2011.

Publication
Written and illustrated by Shinichi Ishizuka, Gaku: Minna no Yama was serialized in Shogakukan's seinen manga magazine Big Comic Original from 20 September 2003 to 5 June 2012. Shogakukan collected its chapters eighteen tankōbon volumes, released from 26 April 2005 to 30 August 2012.

Volume list

Reception

Gaku: Minna no Yama is a best-seller in Japan—for example, volume six reached number 6 on the Tohan Comic Ranking, volume seven also reached number 6, volume eight reached number 14 and remained at number 16 the following week, and volume 9 debuted at number 26 before rising to number 17 the following week. The series was featured by Da Vinci magazine as the Platinum Book of the Month for April 2007.

Gaku: Minna no Yama received the first annual Manga Taisho ("Cartoon Grand Prize") in 2008, and the 2009 Shogakukan Manga Award for general manga.

See also
Blue Giant, another manga series by the same author

References

External links
 Official website 
 

2003 manga
Manga adapted into films
Manga Taishō
Mountaineering in anime and manga
Seinen manga
Sharp Point Press titles
Shogakukan manga
Winners of the Shogakukan Manga Award for general manga